Antonia Santa María Monckeberg (born 22 July 1982) is a Chilean film, television, and theater actress.

Biography
The daughter of Juan Pedro Santa María Pérez, legal director of Banco Santander and great-grandson of President Domingo Santa María, Antonia Santa María attended the Apoquindo School and, after completing her secondary education, studied theater at the Catholic University. She refined her skills with an acting seminar at Alfredo Castro's school. She has also taken singing and dancing courses.

Her first television series was Brujas on Canal 13, playing the role of Sharon Sánchez. She next joined  and Papi Ricky on the same network. In 2008 she began to appear on Televisión Nacional de Chile (TVN) series such as El Señor de la Querencia, Hijos del Monte, Conde Vrolok, La familia de al lado, and La chúcara, with the latter being her first leading role.

In 2006, the year after her premiere in Brujas, she performed professionally in theater for the first time, in the play Oedipus (o La múltiple dislexia), a version of Oedipus Rex written and directed by Luna del Canto.

She debuted on the big screen as Antonia in Las niñas (2007), the award-winning first work by Rodrigo Marín. She acted in Quiero entrar (2011) by Roberto Farías, and Pérez (2012), which was directed by her husband, Álvaro Viguera, and of which she was also a producer. The film, for which Viguera won the Best Director award at the 2012 Santiago International Film Festival, is based on the 2009 play of the same name by Elisa Zulueta (in which Santa María also acted).

She is the youngest of four siblings: painter and musician Pedro Santa María, journalist and singer , and architect and musician Rodrigo Santa María.

Filmography

Films

Telenovelas

TV series and specials

TV programs
  (Mega, 2013) – Guest
  (TVN, 2013) – Participant
 Dudo (2013) – Guest
 Cadena Nacional (Vía X, 2013) – Guest
  (TVN, 2014) – Guest
 La Juguera (TVN, 2017) - Interviewee 
 Muy buenos días (TVN, 2017) – Guest

Music videos
 2012: "Mis cenizas" by Rodrigo Santa María
 2013: "Suicidas" by Rodrigo Santa María

Theater

Discography
 2013: Ceniza (collaboration with Rodrigo Santa María)

References

External links
 

1982 births
21st-century Chilean actresses
Actresses from Santiago
21st-century Chilean women singers
Chilean film producers
Chilean women film producers
Chilean stage actresses
Chilean telenovela actresses
Living people
Pontifical Catholic University of Chile alumni
Singers from Santiago
Chilean people of German descent